Sepiolina is a small genus of bobtail squid in the family Sepiolidae and the subfamily Heteroteuthidinae from the western Pacific Ocean.

Species
There are currently two recognised species of Sepiolina:

Sepiolina nipponensis (Berry, 1911)
Sepiolina petasus Kubodera & Okutani, 2011

References

Cephalopod genera
Bobtail squid
Bioluminescent molluscs
Taxa named by Adolf Naef